Gregory Alexander Renfroe (born May 23, 1986) is an American-born Bosnian professional basketball player for Covirán Granada of the Liga ACB.

College career
Renfroe played college basketball at Belmont University. He was named Atlantic Sun Conference Player of the Year in 2009.

Professional career
After going undrafted in the 2009 NBA draft, Renfroe signed his first professional contract with BK VEF Rīga of Latvia for the 2009–10 season on July 11, 2009.

In August 2010, he signed with the Croatian club Zagreb for the 2010–11 season. On July 18, 2011 he signed with New Basket Brindisi of the Italian Legadue Basket for the 2011–12 season.

On September 24, 2012, he signed with CB Valladolid of Spain for the 2012–13 season. He left them in February 2013, and signed with Brose Baskets of Germany for the rest of the season.

On August 21, 2013, he signed with Yenisey Krasnoyarsk of Russia. 
On May 12, 2014, he signed with Laboral Kutxa Vitoria of Spain for the rest of the 2013–14 season.

On September 24, 2014, Renfroe signed a four-month contract with the German team Alba Berlin. On January 30, 2015, he signed a contract extension with Alba Berlin until June, 2015.

On June 28, 2015, Renfroe signed a two-year contract with the German club Bayern Munich.

On November 29, 2016, he parted ways with Bayern, and signed a contract with the Spanish club FC Barcelona for the rest of the season. On June 8, 2017, Barcelona announced the end of their contract with Renfroe.

On July 24, 2017, Renfroe signed with Turkish club Galatasaray for the 2017–18 season.

On July 18, 2018, Renfroe signed a one-year deal with Baxi Manresa of the Liga ACB.

On December 26, 2018, Renfroe signed with Serbian club Partizan for the rest of the 2018–19 season.

On June 19, 2019, Renfroe signed a one-year contract with the Russian club Zenit Saint Petersburg.

On July 3, 2020, Renfroe signed with San Pablo Burgos of the Liga ACB. With Burgos, he won the 2019–20 Basketball Champions League.

On August 24, 2022, he signed with Covirán Granada of the Spanish Liga ACB.

National team
In 2015, Renfroe received a Bosnian-Herzegovinian passport and represented the Bosnia and Herzegovina national basketball team at EuroBasket 2015.

Career statistics

EuroLeague

|-
| style="text-align:left;"| 2014–15
| style="text-align:left;"| Alba Berlin
| 24 || 8 || 26.5 || .480 || .457 || .824 || 4.5 || 5.3 || 1.4 || .1 || 9.8 || 15.0
|-
| style="text-align:left;"| 2015–16
| style="text-align:left;"| Bayern
| 10 || 10 || 27.0 || .531 || .440 || .800 || 4.2 || 4.2 || .6 || .2 || 10.1 || 11.5
|-
| style="text-align:left;"| 2016–17
| style="text-align:left;"| Barcelona
| 17 || 2 || 17.4 || .444 || .387 || 1.000 || 2.1 || 1.6 || 1.0 || .0 || 4.0 || 4.4
|- class="sortbottom"
| style="text-align:left;"| Career
| style="text-align:left;"|
| 51 || 20 || 21.5 || .480 || .417 || .856 || 3.4|| 3.6 || 1.1 || .1 || 8.0 || 10.1

References

External links

 Alex Renfroe ay acb.com 
 Alex Renfroe  at beko-bbl.de
 Alex Renfroe at eurobasket.com
 Alex Renfroe at euroleague.net

1986 births
Living people
20th-century African-American people
21st-century African-American sportspeople
African-American basketball players
Alba Berlin players
ABA League players
American expatriate basketball people in Croatia
American expatriate basketball people in Germany
American expatriate basketball people in Italy
American expatriate basketball people in Latvia
American expatriate basketball people in Russia
American expatriate basketball people in Serbia
American expatriate basketball people in Spain
American expatriate basketball people in Turkey
American men's basketball players
Basketball League of Serbia players
Basketball players from Tennessee
Bàsquet Manresa players
BC Enisey players
BC Zenit Saint Petersburg players
Belmont Bruins men's basketball players
BK VEF Rīga players
Bosnia and Herzegovina expatriate basketball people in Germany
Bosnia and Herzegovina expatriate basketball people in Serbia
Bosnia and Herzegovina expatriate basketball people in Spain
Bosnia and Herzegovina men's basketball players
Bosnia and Herzegovina people of African-American descent
Brose Bamberg players
CB Valladolid players
FC Barcelona Bàsquet players
FC Bayern Munich basketball players
Galatasaray S.K. (men's basketball) players
KK Partizan players
KK Zagreb players
Liga ACB players
Naturalized citizens of Bosnia and Herzegovina
New Basket Brindisi players
People from Hermitage, Tennessee
Point guards
Saski Baskonia players
Shooting guards
Trevecca Nazarene University alumni